Hvožďany is a municipality and village in Příbram District in the Central Bohemian Region of the Czech Republic. It has about 800 inhabitants.

Administrative parts
Villages of Leletice, Planiny, Pozdyně, Roželov and Vacíkov are administrative parts of Hvožďany.

References

Villages in Příbram District